Hot War is a 1998 Hong Kong thriller film directed by Jingle Ma, starring Ekin Cheng, Jordan Chan and Kelly Chen.

Plot
A group of CIA scientists, C.S. Koo (Jordan Chan), Tango One (Ekin Cheng) and Blue Szeto (Kelly Chan) are working on a secret project called "VR Fighter" which uses a combination of hypnosis and virtual reality to turn ordinary men into super fighters. A rogue terrorist known as Alien (Terence Yin) wants the hypnosis technology to use for inciting riots to drive up commodity prices, and so he kidnaps Blue. C.S. and Tango decide to use VR Fighter to rescue Blue, but during the mission they learn of the project's consequences that it turns some of the subjects into raving homicidal maniacs. The two friends are set against each other, all while Alien is bringing his plan to fruition.

Cast
Ekin Cheng as Tango One
Jordan Chan as C.S. Koo
Kelly Chen as Blue Szeto
Terence Yin as Alien
 as Grace
Ricardo Alexander as Henchman
Rocky Lai as Alien's Thug
Dave Taylor as FBI Agent

Nominations
 18th Hong Kong Film Awards
 Best Editing - Kwong Chi-Leung
 Best Action Design - Stephen Tung Wai
 Best Sound Effects

References

External links

1998 films
1998 action thriller films
Hong Kong action films
1990s Cantonese-language films
1990s Hong Kong films